is a former Japanese football player. He played for Japan national team.

Club career
Sakai was born in Nagareyama on August 2, 1975. He joined his local club Kashiwa Reysol from youth team in 1994. He played as right midfielder. The club won the champions at 1999 J.League Cup. From 2000, his opportunity to play decreased behind Mitsuteru Watanabe. He moved to Consadole Sapporo in 2002. He retired end of 2003 season.

National team career
On October 13, 1996, Sakai debuted for Japan national team against Tunisia.

Club statistics

National team statistics

References

External links
 
 Japan National Football Team Database
 

1975 births
Living people
People from Nagareyama
Association football people from Chiba Prefecture
Japanese footballers
Japan international footballers
J1 League players
J2 League players
Japan Football League (1992–1998) players
Kashiwa Reysol players
Hokkaido Consadole Sapporo players
Association football midfielders